The Séduisant class was a sub-class of 74-gun ships of the line of the French Navy, comprising two ships built at Toulon Dockyard to a design by Joseph-Marie-Blaise Coulomb in the year immediately following the close of the American Revolutionary War. In reality these two ships followed his design for the Centaure Class, but were completed with a length greater by 5¼ feet, and had also slightly less breadth and depth in hold.

 Séduisant
Builder: Toulon
Ordered: 1 June 1782
Begun: August 1782
Launched: 5 July 1783
Completed: 1783
Fate: Wrecked, 16 December 1796

 Mercure
Builder: Toulon
Ordered: 1 June 1782
Begun: August 1782
Launched: 4 August 1783
Completed: 1783
Fate: Burnt by the British after the Battle of the Nile, 2 August 1798

References

Demerliac, Cmdt. Alain, Nomenclature des navires français de 1774 a 1792.  Editions ANCRE, Nice.
Winfield, Rif and Roberts, Stephen (2015) French Warships in the Age of Sail 1786-1861: Design, Construction, Careers and Fates. Seaforth Publishing. .

 
74-gun ship of the line classes
Ship of the line classes from France
Ship classes of the French Navy